The Jersey Shore shark attacks of 1916 were a series of shark attacks along the coast of New Jersey, in the United States, between July 1 and 12, 1916, in which four people were killed and one injured. The incidents occurred during a deadly summer heat wave and polio epidemic in the United States that drove thousands of people to the seaside resorts of the Jersey Shore. Since 1916, scholars have debated which shark species was responsible and the number of animals involved, with the great white shark and the bull shark most frequently cited.

Personal and national reaction to the fatalities involved a wave of panic that led to shark hunts aimed at eradicating the population of "man-eating" sharks and protecting the economies of New Jersey's seaside communities. Resort towns enclosed their public beaches with steel nets to protect swimmers. Scientific knowledge about sharks before 1916 was based on conjecture and speculation. The attacks forced ichthyologists to reassess common beliefs about the abilities of sharks and the nature of shark attacks.

The Jersey Shore attacks immediately entered into American popular culture, where sharks became caricatures in editorial cartoons representing danger.

The attacks became the subject of documentaries for the History Channel, National Geographic Channel, and Discovery Channel, which aired 12 Days of Terror (2004) and the Shark Week episode Blood in the Water (2009).

Incidents and victims

Between July 1 and 12, 1916, five people were attacked along the coast of New Jersey by sharks; only one of the victims survived. The first major attack occurred on Saturday, July 1 at Beach Haven, a resort town established on Long Beach Island off the southern coast of New Jersey. Charles Epting Vansant, 28, of Philadelphia, was on vacation at the Engleside Hotel with his family. Before dinner, Vansant decided to take a quick swim in the Atlantic with a Chesapeake Bay Retriever that was playing on the beach. Shortly after entering the water, Vansant began shouting. Bathers believed he was calling to the dog, but a shark was actually biting Vansant's legs. He was rescued by lifeguard Alexander Ott and bystander Sheridan Taylor, who claimed the shark followed him to shore as they pulled the bleeding Vansant from the water. Vansant's left thigh was stripped of its flesh; he bled to death on the manager's desk of the Engleside Hotel at 6:45 PM.

Despite the Vansant attack, beaches along the Jersey Shore remained open. Sightings of large sharks swimming off the coast of New Jersey were reported by sea captains entering the ports of Newark and New York City but were dismissed. The victim was Charles Bruder, 27, a Swiss bell captain at the Essex & Sussex Hotel. Bruder was attacked while swimming  from shore. A shark bit him in the abdomen and severed his legs; Bruder's blood turned the water red. After hearing screams, a woman notified two lifeguards that a canoe with a red hull had capsized and was floating just at the water's surface. Lifeguards Chris Anderson and George White rowed to Bruder in a lifeboat and realized he had been bitten by a shark. They pulled him from the water, but he bled to death on the way to shore. According to The New York Times, "women [were] panic-stricken [and fainted] as [Bruder's] mutilated body ... [was] brought ashore." Guests and workers at the Essex & Sussex and neighboring hotels raised money for Bruder's mother in Switzerland.

The next two major attacks took place in Matawan Creek near the town of Keyport on Wednesday, July 12. Matawan's location made it an unlikely site for interactions between sharks and humans. When Thomas Cottrell, a sea captain and Matawan resident, spotted an  shark in the creek, the town dismissed him. Around 2:00 PM a group of local boys, including young Lester Stilwell, 11, were playing in the creek together. One of the boys had brought along his pet dog, which was swimming with them as well. At an area called "Wyckoff Dock" they saw what appeared to be an "old, black weather-beaten board or a weathered log." A dorsal fin appeared in the water and the boys realized it was a shark. Before Stilwell could climb from the creek, the shark pulled him underwater.

The boys ran to town for help, and several men, including local businessman Watson Stanley Fisher, 24, came to investigate. Fisher and others dived into the creek to find Stilwell, believing him to have suffered a seizure. After locating the boy's body and attempting to return to shore, Fisher was also bitten by the shark in front of the townspeople, losing Stilwell in the process. His right thigh was severely injured and he bled to death at Monmouth Memorial Hospital in Long Branch at 5:30 PM.

The fifth and final victim, Joseph Dunn, 14, of New York City was attacked a half-mile from the Wyckoff dock nearly 30 minutes after the fatal attacks on Stilwell and Fisher. The shark bit his left leg, but Dunn was rescued by his brother and friend after a vicious tug-of-war battle with the shark. Joseph Dunn was taken to Saint Peter's University Hospital in New Brunswick; he recovered from the bite and was released on September 15, 1916.

Reaction
As the national media descended on Beach Haven, Spring Lake, and Matawan, the Jersey Shore attacks started a shark panic. According to Capuzzo, this panic was "unrivaled in American history", "sweeping along the coasts of New York and New Jersey and spreading by telephone and wireless, letter and postcard."

At first, after the Beach Haven incident, scientists and the press only reluctantly blamed the death of Charles Vansant on a shark. The New York Times reported that Vansant "was badly bitten in the surf ... by a fish, presumably a shark." Still, State Fish Commissioner of Pennsylvania and former director of the Philadelphia Aquarium James M. Meehan asserted in the Philadelphia Public Ledger that the shark was preying on the dog and had bitten Vansant by mistake. He specifically de-emphasized the threat sharks posed to humans:

The media's response to the second attack was more sensational. Major American newspapers such as the Boston Herald, Chicago Sun-Times, The Philadelphia Inquirer, The Washington Post, and San Francisco Chronicle placed the story on the front page. The New York Times' headline read, "Shark Kills Bather Off Jersey Beach". The growing panic cost New Jersey resort owners an estimated $250,000 ($ in ) in lost tourism, and sun bathing declined by 75 percent in some areas.

A press conference was convened on July 8, 1916, at the American Museum of Natural History, with scientists Frederic Augustus Lucas, John Treadwell Nichols, and Robert Cushman Murphy as panelists. To calm the growing panic, the three men stressed that a third run-in with a shark was unlikely, although they were admittedly surprised that sharks bit anyone at all. Nevertheless, Nichols—the only ichthyologist in the trio—warned swimmers to stay close to shore and to take advantage of the netted bathing areas installed at public beaches after the first attack.

Shark sightings increased along the Mid-Atlantic Coast following the attacks. On July 8, armed motorboats patrolling the beach at Spring Creek chased an animal they thought to be a shark, and Asbury Park's Asbury Avenue Beach was closed after lifeguard Benjamin Everingham claimed to have beaten off a  shark with an oar. Sharks were spotted near Bayonne, New Jersey; Rocky Point, New York; Bridgeport, Connecticut; Jacksonville, Florida; and Mobile, Alabama, and a columnist from Field & Stream captured a sandbar shark in the surf at Beach Haven. Actress Gertrude Hoffmann was swimming at the Coney Island beach shortly after the Matawan fatalities when she claimed to have encountered a shark. The New York Times noted that Hoffman "had the presence of mind to remember that she had read in the Times that a bather can scare away a shark by splashing, and she beat up the water furiously." Hoffman was certain she was going to be devoured by the "Jersey man-eater", but later admitted she was "not sure ... whether she had her trouble for nothing or had barely escaped death."

Local New Jersey governments made efforts to protect bathers and the economy from man-eating sharks. The Fourth Avenue Beach at Asbury Park was enclosed with a steel-wire-mesh fence and patrolled by armed motorboats; it remained the only beach open following the Everingham incident. After the attacks on Stilwell, Fisher, and Dunn, residents of Matawan lined Matawan Creek with nets and detonated dynamite in an attempt to catch and kill the shark. Matawan mayor Arris B. Henderson ordered the Matawan Journal to print wanted posters offering a $100 reward ($ in  dollars) to anyone who killed a shark in the creek. Despite the town's efforts, no sharks were captured or killed in Matawan Creek.

Resort communities along the Jersey Shore petitioned the federal government to aid local efforts to protect beaches and hunt sharks. The House of Representatives appropriated $5,000 ($ in  dollars) for eradicating the New Jersey shark threat, and President Woodrow Wilson scheduled a meeting with his Cabinet to discuss the fatal attacks. Treasury secretary William Gibbs McAdoo suggested that the Coast Guard be mobilized to patrol the Jersey Shore and protect sun bathers. Shark hunts ensued across the coasts of New Jersey and New York; as the Atlanta Constitution reported on July 14, "Armed shark hunters in motor boats patrolled the New York and New Jersey coasts today while others lined the beaches in a concerted effort to exterminate the man-eaters ..." New Jersey governor James Fairman Fielder and local municipalities offered bounties to individuals hunting sharks. Hundreds of sharks were captured on the East Coast as a result of the attacks. The East Coast shark hunt has been described as "the largest scale animal hunt in history."

Identifying the "Jersey man-eater"
After the second incident, scientists and the public began presenting theories to explain which species of shark was responsible for the Jersey Shore attacks or whether multiple sharks were involved.

Lucas and Nichols proposed that a northward-swimming rogue shark was responsible. They believed it would eventually arrive along New York's coast: "Unless the shark came through the Harbor and went through the north through Hell Gate and Long Island Sound, it was presumed it would swim along the South Shore of Long Island and the first deep water inlet it reaches will be the Jamaica Bay."

A sea captain who saw the event believed it was a Spanish shark driven from the Caribbean Sea decades earlier by bombings during the Spanish–American War. Several fishermen claimed to have caught the "Jersey man-eater" in the days following the attacks. A blue shark was captured on July 14 near Long Branch, and four days later the same Thomas Cottrell who had seen the shark in Matawan Creek claimed to have captured a sandbar shark with a gillnet near the mouth of the creek.

The shark nearly sank the boat before Schleisser killed it with a broken oar. When he opened the shark's belly, he removed a "suspicious fleshy material and bones" that took up "about two-thirds of a milk crate" and "together weighed fifteen pounds." Scientists identified the shark as a young great white and the ingested remains as human. Schleisser mounted the shark and placed it on display in the window of a Manhattan shop on Broadway, but it was later lost. The only surviving photograph appeared in the Bronx Home News.

No further attacks were reported along the Jersey Shore in the summer of 1916 after the capture of Schleisser's great white shark. Murphy and Lucas declared the great white to be the "Jersey man-eater".

Skeptical individuals, however, offered alternative hypotheses, including opinions suggesting a non-shark perpetrator and even the influence of ongoing events associated with World War I.

Another letter to The New York Times blamed the shark infestation on the maneuvers of German U-boats near America's East Coast. The anonymous writer claimed, "These sharks may have devoured human bodies in the waters of the German war zone and followed liners to this coast, or even followed the Deutschland herself, expecting the usual toll of drowning men, women, and children." The writer concluded, "This would account for their boldness and their craving for human flesh."

Over a century later, there is no consensus among researchers over Murphy and Lucas' investigation and findings. Richard G. Fernicola published two studies of the event, and notes that "there are many theories behind the New Jersey attacks," and all are inconclusive. Researchers such as Thomas Helm, Harold W. McCormick, Thomas B. Allen, William Young, Jean Campbell Butler, and Michael Capuzzo generally agree with Murphy and Lucas.

However, the National Geographic Society reported in 2002 that "some experts are suggesting that the great white may not in fact be responsible for many of the attacks pinned on the species. These people say the real culprit behind many of the reported incidents—including the famous 1916 shark attacks in New Jersey that may have served as inspiration for Jaws—may be the lesser known bull shark."

Biologists George A. Llano and Richard Ellis suggest that a bull shark could have been responsible for the fatal Jersey Shore attacks. Bull sharks swim from the ocean into freshwater rivers and streams and have attacked people around the world. In his book Sharks: Attacks on Man (1975), Llano writes,

Ellis points out that the great white "is an oceanic species, and Schleisser's shark was caught in the ocean. To find it swimming in a tidal creek is, to say the least, unusual, and may even be impossible. The bull shark, however, is infamous for its freshwater meanderings, as well as for its pugnacious and aggressive nature." He admits that "the bull shark is not a common species in New Jersey waters, but it does occur more frequently than the white."

In an interview with Michael Capuzzo, ichthyologist George H. Burgess surmises, "The species involved has always been doubtful and likely will continue to generate spirited debate." Burgess, however, does not discount the great white:

The casualties of the 1916 attacks are listed in the International Shark Attack File—of which Burgess is director—as victims of a great white.

The increased presence of humans in the water proved a factor in the attacks: "As the worldwide human population continues to rise year after year, so does ... interest in aquatic recreation. The number of shark attacks in any given year or region is highly influenced by the number of people entering the water." However, the likelihood that one shark was involved is contested. Scientists such as Victor M. Coppleson and Jean Butler, relying on evidence presented by Lucas and Murphy in 1916, assert that a single shark was responsible. On the other hand, Richard Fernicola notes that 1916 was a "shark year", as fishermen and captains were reporting hundreds of sharks swimming in the Mid-Atlantic region of the United States. Ellis remarks that "to try to make the facts as we know them conform to the 'rogue shark' theory is stretching sensationalism and credibility beyond reasonable limits." He admits, "The evidence is long gone, and we will never really know if it was one shark or several, one species or another, that was responsible."

In 2011, further study was conducted in the Smithsonian Channel's The Real Story: Jaws. The documentary takes a closer look at the series of events from different perspectives. It was demonstrated in the Matawan Creek attacks, for example, that the full moon of the lunar cycle, which would have coincided with the attacks, would have raised the salinity in the water by more than double just a few hours before high tide. This would support the theory that a great white could have been responsible. Other evidence such as Joseph Dunn's injury suggested that the type of bite was more likely made by a bull shark as opposed to a great white, leading some to believe more than one shark was likely involved in the five incidents.

Revising science
Before 1916, American scholars doubted that sharks would fatally wound a living person in the temperate waters of the northeastern United States without provocation. One skeptical scientist wrote, "There is a great difference between being attacked by a shark and being bitten by one." He believed that sharks tangled in fishing nets or feeding on carrion might accidentally bite a nearby human. In 1891, millionaire banker and adventurer Hermann Oelrichs offered a $500 reward in the New York Sun "for an authenticated case of a man having been attacked by a shark in [the] temperate waters" north of Cape Hatteras, North Carolina. He wanted proof that "in temperate waters even one man, woman, or child, while alive, was ever attacked by a shark." The reward went unclaimed and scientists remained convinced that the upper eastern coast of the United States was inhabited by harmless sharks.

Academics were skeptical that a shark could produce fatal wounds on human victims. Ichthyologist Henry Weed Fowler and curator Henry Skinner of the Academy of Natural Sciences in Philadelphia asserted that a shark's jaws did not have the power to sever a human leg in a single bite. Frederic Lucas, director of the American Museum of Natural History, questioned whether a shark even as large as 30 feet (9 m) could snap a human bone. He told The Philadelphia Inquirer in early 1916 that "it is beyond the power even of the largest Carcharodon to sever the leg of an adult man." Lucas summed up his argument by pointing to Oelrichs's unclaimed reward and that the chances of being bitten by a shark were "infinitely less than that of being struck by lightning and that there is practically no danger of an attack from a shark about our coasts."

The Jersey Shore attacks compelled scientists in the United States to revise their assumptions that sharks were timid and powerless. In July 1916, ichthyologist and editor for the National Geographic Society Hugh McCormick Smith published an article in the Newark Star-Eagle describing some shark species as "harmless as doves and others the incarnation of ferocity." He continued, "One of the most prodigious, and perhaps the most formidable of sharks is the man-eater, Carcharodon carcharias [great white]. It roams through all temperate and tropical seas, and everywhere is an object of dread.

By the end of July 1916, John Nichols and Robert Murphy were taking the great white more seriously. In Scientific American, Murphy wrote that the "white shark is perhaps the rarest of all noteworthy sharks ... their habits are little known, but they are said to feed to some extent on big sea turtles ... Judging from its physical make-up, it would not hesitate to attack a man in open water." He concluded that "because it is evident that even a relatively small white shark, weighing two or three hundred pounds, might readily snap the largest human bones by a jerk of its body, after it has bitten through the flesh."

Robert Murphy and John Nichols wrote in October 1916:

After the Matawan attacks, Frederic Lucas admitted on the front page of The New York Times that he had underestimated sharks. The paper reported that "the foremost authority on sharks in this country has doubted that any shark ever attacked a human being, and has published his doubts, but the recent cases have changed his view."  Nichols later documented the occurrence of the great white shark in his biological survey Fishes of the Vicinity of New York City (1918), "Carcharodon carcharias (Linn.) White Shark. "Man-eater." Accidental in summer. June to July 14, 1916."

Cultural impact

Whereas sharks had previously been seen as harmless, after the Jersey Shore attacks of 1916 the pendulum of public opinion swung to the other extreme, and sharks quickly came to be viewed not only as eating machines, but also as fearless, ruthless killers.

After the first fatality, newspaper cartoonists began using sharks as caricatures for political figures, German U-boats, Victorian morality and fashion, polio, and the deadly heat wave threatening the Northeast at the time. Fernicola notes, "Since 1916 was among the years that Americans were trying to break away from the rigidity and conservatism of the Victorian period, one comic depicted a risqué polka-dot bathing suit and advertised it as the secret weapon to keep sharks away from our swimmers." Another cartoon depicted "an exasperated individual at the end of a dock that displays a 'Danger: No Swimming' sign and mentions the three most emphasized 'danger' topics of the day: 'Infantile Paralysis (polio), Epidemic Heat Wave, and Sharks in the Ocean'." The cartoon is entitled "What's a Family Man to Do?" With World War I ongoing in 1916 and America's growing distrust of Germany, cartoonists depicted U-boats with the mouth and fins of a shark assaulting Uncle Sam while he wades in the water.

In 1974, writer Peter Benchley published Jaws, a novel about a rogue great white shark that terrorizes the fictional Long Island coastal community of Amity. Chief of police Martin Brody, biologist Matt Hooper, and fisherman Quint hunt the shark after it kills four people. The novel was adapted as the film Jaws by Steven Spielberg in 1975. Spielberg's film makes reference to the events of 1916: Brody (Roy Scheider) and Hooper (Richard Dreyfuss) urge Amity's Mayor Vaughn (Murray Hamilton) to close the beaches on the Fourth of July after the deaths of two swimmers and a fisherman. Hooper explains to the mayor, "Look, the situation is that apparently a great white shark has staked a claim in the waters off Amity Island. And he's going to continue to feed here as long as there is food in the water." Brody adds, "And there's no limit to what he's gonna do! I mean we've already had three incidents, two people killed inside of a week. And it's gonna happen again, it happened before! The Jersey beach! ... 1916! Five people chewed up on the surf!" Richard Ellis, Richard Fernicola, and Michael Capuzzo all suggest that the 1916 Jersey Shore attacks, Coppleson's rogue shark theory, and the exploits of New York fisherman Frank Mundus inspired Benchley. The attacks are also briefly referred to in Benchley's novel White Shark.

The 1916 fatal attacks are the subject of three studies: Richard G. Fernicola's In Search of the "Jersey Man-Eater" (1987) and Twelve Days of Terror (2001) and Michael Capuzzo's Close to Shore (2001). Capuzzo offers an in-depth dramatization of the incident, and Fernicola examines the scientific, medical, and social aspects of the attacks. Fernicola's research is the basis of an episode of the History Channel's documentary series In Search of History titled "Shark Attack 1916" (2001) and the Discovery Channel's docudrama 12 Days of Terror (2004). Fernicola also wrote and directed a 90-minute documentary called Tracking the Jersey Man-Eater. It was produced by the George Marine Library in 1991; however, it was never widely released.

The attacks at Matawan are the subject of the National Geographic Channel documentary Attacks of the Mystery Shark (2002), which examines the possibility that a bull shark was responsible for killing Stanley Fisher and Lester Stilwell; Discovery Channel's Blood in the Water (2009); Shore Thing (2009) (directed by Lovari and James Hill); and the Smithsonian Channel's The Real Story: Jaws (2011).

Seattle hardcore band Akimbo's 2008 concept album Jersey Shores was based on the 1916 attacks.

See also
List of fatal shark attacks in the United States
Summer of the Shark

References

Further reading

 Capuzzo, Michael. "Close to Shore: A True Story of Terror in an Age of Innocence". New York. Broadway Books, 2001. .
 Fernicola, Richard G. In Search of the "Jersey Man-Eater": An Exhaustive Investigation of the Infamous Shark Attacks that Plagued the New Jersey Shore during the Summer of 1916. Deal, N.J.: George Marine Library, 1986. 
 Fleming, Thomas J. New Jersey: A History. New York: W. W. Norton, 1984. .
 Genovese, Peter. The Jersey Shore Uncovered: A Revealing Season on the Beach. New Brunswick, New Jersey: Rutgers University Press, 2003. .
 Henderson, Helen. Matawan and Aberdeen: Of Town and Field. Charleston, S.C.: Arcadia Publishing, 2003. .
 May, Nathaniel. Shark: Stories of Life and Death from the World's Most Dangerous Waters. New York: Thunder's Mouth Press, 2002. .
Nichols, John T. Fishes of the vicinity of New York city, by John Treadwell Nichols, with an introduction by William K. Gregory. New York, Printed at the Museum, 1918.  https://www.biodiversitylibrary.org/bibliography/1951.
 Stansfield, Charles A., Jr. Vacationing on the Jersey Shore: The Past and Present, with a Guide to the Beach Resorts. Mechanicsburg, Penn.: Stackpole Books, 2004. .

External links

 Jersey Shore shark attacks of 1916 bibliography 
 Jersey Shore Attacks of 1916 at UnMuseum.org
 Listen to this article or download mp3 of Jersey Shore shark attacks of 1916 from the Internet Archive

1916 in New Jersey
Deaths due to shark attacks
Deaths due to animal attacks in the United States
Monmouth County, New Jersey
Ocean County, New Jersey
Accidental deaths in New Jersey
Individual wild animals
Natural disasters in New Jersey
1916 natural disasters in the United States
July 1916 events
Shark attacks